Fort Lauderdale Sun was a U.S. soccer team which played two seasons in the United Soccer League.  In 1984, the team was known as the Fort Lauderdale Sun. Before the 1985 season they changed their name to the South Florida Sun.

Origins
The United Soccer League (USL) was formed after the American Soccer League (ASL) folded in 1983.  The ASL had served as the de facto U.S. second division for decades, but collapsed due to overexpansion and financial insolvency.  The USL intended to avoid this fate by creating a lean, financially responsible league.  In 1984, the league began play with nine teams in three regional divisions.  Fort Lauderdale joined the Charlotte Gold and Jacksonville Tea Men in the Southern Division.  Both of the Sun's opponents had migrated from the ASL to the USL.  Additionally, the Tea Men had played several seasons in the first division North American Soccer League until 1982. The team was originally owned by retired Fort Lauderdale Strikers player, Ronnie Sharp, but he was forced to sell the team shortly after the 1984 season because of his involvement in a drug smuggling operation. Entertainment Investors, Inc., which was mostly made up of a group of doctors that used to sit together at Strikers' games, took over control of the Sun until the team folded in July 1985.

1984: Champions
The Sun gained a significant boost when it signed former Peruvian great Teófilo Cubillas.  Cubillas joined several other NASL veterans on the Sun, giving the team one of the most talented rosters in the new league. This paid dividends as they played to a 15-9 record, scoring fifty-three goals and giving up only thirty-four.  After making the playoffs, the Sun crushed the Buffalo Storm in the semi-finals, then defeated the Houston Dynamos to take the 1984 league title.

Florida Derby
On June 27 the Sun made their only appearance in the Florida Derby, falling to the Tampa Bay Rowdies, 5–1, in an inter-league friendly. Two more derby matches were planned for in 1985, but the Sun closed up shop before those games could materialize.

1985: League Cup and league collapse
Despite the league's financial austerity, it lost most of its teams during the off season.  Only four remained to begin the 1985 season, and the league folded after only six games.  The Sun, renamed the South Florida Sun, led the league standings with a 4-2 record when the league collapsed in late June. By virtue of their 1-0 win over the Tulsa Tornados on June 15, the Sun also won the league's Invitational Cup in front of 2,324 fans at Lockhart Stadium. As a harbinger of things to come, no actual cup was presented to them, causing Sun player-coach, Keith Weller, to quip, "There ain't no cup." The Sun's final USL match, a 3–1 victory, was played on June 22, versus the Dallas Americans. It turned out to be the only USL regular season game played that year, as the league suspended play a few days later.

Team officials tried in vain to carry on by staging exhibitions matches against a Haitian Select team, the Minnesota Strikers and Tampa Bay Rowdies, among others. The idea was to help offset owed payroll to the squad. The position of General Manager was eliminated and new investors were sought. In the end only the match against the Topez-Haitian All-Stars materialized. In it, the Sun rallied to win what was to be their final game, 4-3, on the fourth of July before a Lockhart Stadium crowd of 3,529. After that match's proceeds were divvied up, the players began to disperse back into everyday life.

Honors
Champion
 1984

USL Invitational Cup
 1985

Rookie of the Year
 Mark Schwartz 1984

Top Goalkeeper
 Jim Tietjens 1984

Year-by-year

1985 USL League Cup standings

1985 team scoring leaders*

1985 team goalkeeping stats*
 *USL cup only

See also

Fort Lauderdale Strikers (1977–1983)
Fort Lauderdale Strikers (1988–94)
Fort Lauderdale Strikers (1994–1997)
Miami Fusion Now defunct MLS team (1997–2001)
Fort Lauderdale Strikers -of Div. 2 NASL, originally named Miami FC
Fort Lauderdale–Tampa Bay rivalry

References

External links
 Overview of Fort Lauderdale soccer

United Soccer League (1984–85) teams
Soccer clubs in Miami
Soccer clubs in Florida
Defunct soccer clubs in Florida
1983 establishments in Florida
1985 disestablishments in Florida
Association football clubs established in 1983
Association football clubs disestablished in 1985